The NZR W class consisted of two steam locomotives built at the Addington Railway Workshops in Christchurch, New Zealand by the New Zealand Railways Department (NZR). They were the first locomotives to be built by NZR.

Almost all subsequent tank locomotive classes built by NZR were classified as sub-classes of the W class, e.g. WA, WAB, WB. The only exception was the Y class.

Introduction 
The class originated from proposals to build tank locomotives from parts imported for the original J class. The design evolved into a completely New Zealand built locomotives.

Preserved locomotives
After withdrawal W 192 was stored at Hillside Workshops until 1962 when the New Zealand Railways Department used it for promotions. In 1964 it was placed in storage in Arthurs Pass. In 1973 it was restored as a static display for the NZR. But in 1979 it was restored to operational condition and used in places with F 163 including shuttle trains in Wellington. In 1988 it was used hauling trains from Christchurch to Rangiora for a week for the Ferrymead 125 celebrations.

One of the days it was taken out of service for repairs to her firebox and was replaced by C 864, but returned to service the following day. In 1992 W 192 was leased to the Ashburton Railway & Preservation Society for uses on their former Mount Somers Branchline at The Plains Vintage Railway & Historical Museum. In 1993 the NZR sold 192 to the Rail Heritage Trust of New Zealand. On 16 and 17 September 1995 the W took part at the 1995 Waipara Vintage Festival held by the Weka Pass Railway. After the festival, it was returned to The Plains Railway. It was sent again to Waipara for the 1997 festival then repeated again in 1999. During the 1999 festival it developed minor boiler issues and only ran one trip to Waikari from Glenmark, but only ran in more minor roles. In 2001 it was transported to the Linwood Locomotive Depot from The Plains and placed into storage. On 7 October 2003 it was announced by the Rail Heritage Trust of New Zealand it would be on long-term loan to the Canterbury Railway Society for uses at the Ferrymead Heritage Park. It arrived during the same month just in time for the 140th Railway celebrations at Ferrymead.

See also
 NZR WA class
 NZR WB class
 NZR WD class
 NZR WE class
 NZR WF class
 NZR WG class
 NZR WW class
 NZR WS / WAB class
 Locomotives of New Zealand

References

Citations

Bibliography

External links
 NZ Steam - W class

2-6-2T locomotives
W class
3 ft 6 in gauge locomotives of New Zealand
Railway locomotives introduced in 1889